Hugh Tucker is an American gasser drag racer. Tucker was the first driver to win three National Hot Rod Association (NHRA) national championships in a gas supercharged class.

Racing career 
Driving an Oldsmobile-powered 1928 Chevrolet, he won NHRA's A/SR (gas) national title at the NHRA Nationals, held at Indianapolis Raceway Park, in 1962. At the Winternationals, he claimed the Little Eliminator win.

The next year, he added a supercharger to the Oldsmobile engine. At the NHRA Nationals, he again won the AA/SR national title, at Indianapolis. He also claimed Junior Eliminator at the Winternationals, over Bob Culbert.

In 1966, a Chrysler hemi replaced the Oldmobile.

References

Sources
Davis, Larry. Gasser Wars.  North Branch, MN:  Cartech, 2003, pp. 180–6.

Dragster drivers
American racing drivers
Year of birth missing